The Calgary Oval X-Treme were a professional women's ice hockey team in  the Western Women's Hockey League  (WWHL). The team played its home games at the Olympic Oval  in Calgary, Alberta, Canada. The Oval X-Treme were a member of the National Women's Hockey League for two seasons before breaking away to help form the WWHL in 2004.

History
The Oval X-Treme were founded in 1995 as an amateur team for women's hockey players in Calgary, quickly developing a heated rivalry with their northern counterparts, the Edmonton Chimos. In 2002, the Oval X-Treme were approached, along with the Chimos, to join the National Women's Hockey League (NWHL). The two teams joined the Vancouver Griffins to form the West division of the NWHL. After the 03-04 season, where the Oval X-Treme and Chimos faced only each other due to prohibitive costs to fly out east, the two franchises left the NWHL to form the five team Western Women's Hockey League. In 2006, the two leagues were reunited under the NWHL banner. However, this was short lived as the NWHL and WWHL could not reach an agreement upon a playoff schedule. As a result, the merger was not consummated. With the collapse of the NWHL in the summer of 2007, the Western Women's Hockey League was once again a completely independent league.

The Calgary Oval X-Treme suspended activities for the 2009-10 season.

Partially as a result of the Canada national team being based in Calgary, the Oval X-Treme featured many of Canada's top women's hockey players, including Hayley Wickenheiser, Danielle Goyette and Cassie Campbell. As a result, the Oval X-Treme became the undisputed powerhouse of women's hockey in western Canada, winning five consecutive league championships, and compiling a regular season mark of 95-3-2-1 in their last five seasons.

Gina Kingsbury joined the Oval X-Treme in 2006. She had 31 points (11 goals, 20 assists) in 19 games as the Oval X-Treme went on to win the Esso Women's National Championship. In her second season with the Oval X-Treme, Kingsbury scored 20 goals and added 25 assists in 23 games.

Season-by-season 
in National Women's Hockey League (NWHL): 
See also:  2002–03 NWHL season
See also:  2003–04 NWHL season
in Western Women's Hockey League (WWHL): 
See also:  2004–05 WWHL season
See also:  2005–06 WWHL season
See also:  2006–07 WWHL season
See also:  2007–08 WWHL season
See also:  2008–09 WWHL season

Note: GP = Games played, W = Wins, L = Losses, T = Ties, GF = Goals for, GA = Goals against, Pts = Points.

Season standings

Last Roster 2008-09

 and

Coaching Staff 2008-09
    General Manager: Kathy Berg
    Head Coach: Bjorn Kinding
    Assistant Coach:  Bart Doan

Awards and honors
NWHL Division titles won: 2002-03, 2003-04.
Championship of the NWHL: 2002-03, 2003-04.
WWHL Regular season titles won: 2004-05, 2005-06, 2006-07, 2007-08, 2008-09.
WWHL Champions cup: 2004-05, 2005-06, 2006-07, 2007-08.
Esso Canadian national championships won: 1998, 2001, 2003, 2007.

Notable players

 Dana Antal
 Kelly Bechard
 Tessa Bonhomme
 Cassie Campbell
 Delaney Collins
 Danielle Goyette
 Kaley Hall
 Samantha Holmes
 Gina Kingsbury
 Kim McCullough
 Carla MacLeod
 Cherie Piper
 Colleen Sostorics
 Hayley Wickenheiser

See also
Western Women's Hockey League (WWHL)
List of ice hockey teams in Alberta
Ice hockey in Calgary

References

Defunct ice hockey teams in Canada
Oval X-Treme, Calgary
Ice hockey clubs established in 1995
Ice hockey clubs disestablished in 2009
Women's ice hockey teams in Canada
Western Women's Hockey League teams
1995 establishments in Alberta
2009 disestablishments in Alberta
Women in Alberta